Cornelia Bachofner is a Swiss former slalom canoeist who competed in the 1970s.

She won a gold medal in the K-1 team event at the 1975 ICF Canoe Slalom World Championships in Skopje.

References
Overview of athlete's results at canoeslalom.net

Swiss female canoeists
Possibly living people
Year of birth missing (living people)
Medalists at the ICF Canoe Slalom World Championships